Sneha is an Indian given name.

Sneha may also refer to:

 Sneha College of Architecture, Kerala, India
 Sneha (film), a 1999 Indian Kannada language film

See also